Bakharevka Airport  was an air base in Perm Krai, Russia, located 6 km southwest of Perm. Until 1965 this was the major civilian airport in Perm City and handled medium-sized and small aircraft, such as the Lisunov Li-2, Ilyushin Il-14, Antonov An-24, Antonov An-2, and Yakovlev Yak-12.  After 1965, the major airport was relocated to Bolshoye Savino Airport, which was a military airfield.

References
RussianAirFields.com

Soviet Air Force bases
Russian Air Force bases
Airports built in the Soviet Union
Airports in Perm Krai